The Interrupters are an American ska punk band formed in Los Angeles, California, in 2011. The band comprises lead vocalist Aimee Interrupter, drummer Jesse Bivona, bassist Justin Bivona, and guitarist Kevin Bivona. They have released four studio albums. The latest, In the Wild, was released in 2022, along with the album's lead single, "Raised by Wolves".

History

Formation and early years
The three Bivona brothers met Aimee Allen, a solo artist at the time, in 2009 while touring with their band Telacasters supporting The Dirty Heads and Sugar Ray. In 2011, Aimee and Kevin started writing songs together and brought Kevin's brothers, twins Jesse and Justin, in to play drums and bass. That led to the four forming The Interrupters.

The band got an early start, touring with bands such as Rancid, The Transplants, Devil's Brigade, and Left Alone; as well as playing the American music festival Riot Fest in Chicago and Denver, and the Canadian music festival Amnesia Rockfest, all before the release of their first record.

They were frequently involved with Tim Armstrong's Tim Timebomb and Friends project, which saw the online-release of a song a day for an entire year. They were also members of the touring group. The first single released was the song "Liberty", followed shortly thereafter by the song "Family", which features a guest vocal by Tim Armstrong and was previously released through the Tim Timebomb and Friends project. Both singles were released as limited edition 7"s through Pirates Press Records.

The Interrupters, Say It Out Loud
The Interrupters' debut self-titled record was released August 5, 2014 on Hellcat/Epitaph Records. Following the release, the band toured the US and Canada in support of the album with the likes of The Mighty Mighty Bosstones, Street Dogs, Less Than Jake, Big D and The Kids Table, Reel Big Fish, Rancid, and The English Beat; and toured Europe with Bad Religion; and also played Soundwave Festival in Australia, and Groezrock Festival in Belgium.

The Interrupters' second record Say It Out Loud was released June 24, 2016 on Hellcat/Epitaph Records. Produced again by Tim Armstrong, the album peaked at number 7 on the Billboard Heatseekers Album chart, number 25 on the Billboard Independent albums chart, number 38 on the Billboard Top Rock Albums chart, number 22 on the Billboard Vinyl Albums chart.

In support of Say It Out Loud, the band played on the entire Vans Warped Tour during the summer of 2016, and then embarked on their first US headlining tour, bringing Fat Wreck Chords' band Bad Cop Bad Cop along for support.

Fight the Good Fight 
On May 2, 2018, the Interrupters announced the album Fight the Good Fight, produced by Tim Armstrong, released on June 29 on Hellcat/Epitaph. The lead single, "She's Kerosene", peaked at number 4 on Billboards Alternative Songs chart. The album has reached number 2 on the Billboard Independent Albums, and number 141 on the Billboard 200. The band were featured on the cover of Kerrang! magazine in May 2019 and were nominated for 'Best International Breakthrough' at the 2019 Kerrang! Awards.

Billy Kottage, formerly of Reel Big Fish, has been touring with the band as a featured musician since early 2019, playing the Hammond organ and trombone.

The Interrupters' single "Take Back the Power" served as the intro music for Hillary, a 2020 docuseries about Hillary Clinton.

Band members

Band members 
 Aimee Interrupter – lead vocals (2011–present)
 Kevin Bivona – guitar, lead and backing vocals (2011–present)
 Justin Bivona – bass, backing vocals (2011–present)
 Jesse Bivona – drums, backing vocals (2011–present)

Touring members 
 Billy Kottage - keyboards, trombone, backing vocals (2019-present)

Discography

Albums

Studio albums

Live albums

Singles

Compilations and splits
 2016 Warped Tour Compilation – various artists, Side One Dummy Records (2016)
 Hooligans United: A Tribute to Rancid – Various artists, Hellcat/Smelvis Records (2015)
 Dale la Bota – various artists, Smelvis Records (2013)
 2018 Warped Tour Compilation – various artists, Side One Dummy Records (2018)
 Ska Against Racism – various artists, Bad Time Records (2020)

Notes

References

External links
 
 The Interrupters chart history at Billboard
 

2011 establishments in California
Musical groups established in 2011
Hellcat Records artists
Epitaph Records artists
Female-fronted musical groups
American ska punk musical groups
Musical groups from Los Angeles
Musical quartets
Sibling musical groups
Post–third wave ska groups